Marcos Aurelio Di Paulo (27 September 1920 in Buenos Aires – 28 September 1996) was an Argentine-born former footballer. He played with FC Barcelona since 1948 until 1951 and scored the goal number 1000 for FC Barcelona in La Liga.

Before arriving in Spain he played for Chacarita Juniors, Vélez Sársfield and Club León.

References

External links
 La Liga Profile

1920 births
1996 deaths
Argentine people of Italian descent
Argentine footballers
Argentine expatriate footballers
Chacarita Juniors footballers
Club Atlético Vélez Sarsfield footballers
FC Barcelona players
Club León footballers
La Liga players
Liga MX players
Footballers from Buenos Aires
Argentine expatriate sportspeople in Spain
Expatriate footballers in Spain
Expatriate footballers in Mexico
Association football forwards